David Chilia (born 10 June 1978 in Port Vila) is a former Vanuatuan international footballer who played as a goalkeeper. He is the current goalkeeping coach of Erakor Golden Star

External links

References

1978 births
Living people
Vanuatuan footballers
Vanuatu international footballers
1998 OFC Nations Cup players
2000 OFC Nations Cup players
2002 OFC Nations Cup players
2004 OFC Nations Cup players
2008 OFC Nations Cup players
Association football goalkeepers